John Billing, FRIBA was an English architect from Reading, Berkshire. His grandfather Richard Billing (circa 1747–1826), father Richard Billing (1784–1853), brothers Richard (1814–84) and Arthur (1824–96) and nephew Arthur Ernest (died 1920) were also architects.

Career
 
Until at least 1854, Billing practiced in Reading, Berkshire, where he was Borough Surveyor. Billing addressed a meeting of the 1849–50 session of the Oxford Architectural Society on the subject of "Parsonage Houses".

Billing had moved his practice to London by 1856, in which year he was made a Fellow of the Royal Institute of British Architects. Philip Webb (1831–1915) was a pupil of his.

Works
Christ Church Cathedral, Oxford: repairs, 1853–56
St. Giles' parish church, Tetsworth, Oxfordshire, 1855
St. Mary's parish church, Sydenham, Oxfordshire: restoration, 1856
St. Leonard's parish church, Seaford, East Sussex: transepts and apse, 1861–62
St. Katherine & St. Leonard's Rectory, Drayton St. Leonard, Oxfordshire, 1862

References

Sources

External links
 

1863 deaths
Gothic Revival architects
English ecclesiastical architects
1816 births
Architects of cathedrals
Architects from Berkshire
19th-century English architects
Fellows of the Royal Institute of British Architects